William J. O'Neil (born March 25, 1933) is an American entrepreneur, stockbroker and writer, who founded the stock brokerage firm William O'Neil & Co. Inc in 1963 and the business newspaper Investor's Business Daily in 1984. He is the author of the books How to Make Money in Stocks,  24 Essential Lessons for Investment Success and The Successful Investor among others, and is the creator of the CAN SLIM investment strategy.

Early life and education 
O'Neil was born March 25, 1933, in Oklahoma City and raised in Texas. In 1951, he graduated from Woodrow Wilson High School in Dallas, Texas. He studied business at Southern Methodist University, received a bachelor's degree in 1955 and served in the United States Air Force.

Career

Early career
In 1958, O'Neil started his career as a stockbroker at Hayden, Stone & Company, and developed an investment strategy which made early use of computers. In 1960, he was accepted to Harvard Business School's first Program for Management Development (PMD). From his research, O'Neil invented the CAN SLIM strategy and became the top-performing broker in his firm. He bought a seat on the NYSE at age 30 and became the youngest at that time ever to do so. In 1963, he founded William O'Neil + Co. Inc., a company which developed the first computerized daily securities database and sold its research to institutional investors and tracks over 70,000 companies worldwide.

Daily Graphs was launched by William O'Neil to produce Daily Graphs, a printed book of stock charts delivered weekly to subscribers in 1972.  In 1998, O'Neil launched Daily Graphs Online as a comprehensive online equity research tool and an extension of the Daily Graphs business he launched in 1972. In 2010, Daily Graphs Inc. and its service was re-branded as MarketSmith.

In 1973, he founded "O'Neil Data Systems, Inc.", to provide high-speed printing and database-publishing facilities. The company now operates as O'Neil Digital Solutions and has operations in Los Angeles, Dallas and Monroe, North Carolina. The firm provides data-driven publishing and marketing communications.

In 1988, O'Neil had a Mon-Fri stock market program on a Los Angeles UHF television station. KWHY-TV Channel 22 would broadcast the one-hour program with O'Neil holding center court. He would discuss the daily general market averages closing, why they closed as they did and what it might portend for the following trading day. The last fifteen minutes of the program were dedicated to the audience; a viewer could call the station, mention a stock they owned or were looking to purchase. O'Neil would bring up a chart on the TV screen of that stock and discuss its merits or caution the viewer. O'Neil would show a chart pattern and advise where to buy or sell. Also, early in the program, stocks that were highlighted were some of the Investor's Daily 200 stock list companies.

Investor's Business Daily
In 1984, O'Neil made research from his database available in print form with the launch of Investor's Daily, a national business newspaper aimed to compete with The Wall Street Journal.  In 1991, the publication's name was changed from Investor's Daily to Investor's Business Daily.

As of 2015, the newspaper had a circulation of 113,000 and its website attracted 2.9 million visitors a month. In 2016, the newspaper changed its printing schedule to weekly, but continued to publish news daily on its website.

Personal life
O'Neil is married and has four children. He stated in a 2002 interview that one of the books which was an early influence on him was Gerald Loeb's The Battle for Investment Survival. According to O'Neil, this is the best book on the market. Other investors which he took great interest in were Bernard Baruch, Jesse Livermore, Gerald M. Loeb, Jack Dreyfus, and Nicolas Darvas.  He also greatly admired Thomas Edison.
In 2007, O'Neil started donating to his alma mater, Southern Methodist University and funded a chair in business journalism at SMU's Meadows School of the Arts, he then endowed a professorship in markets and freedom and created the William J. O'Neil Center for Global Markets and Freedom at the university's Cox School of Business.

Bibliography 
 The Model Book of Greatest Stock Market Winners
 24 Essential Lessons for Investment Success, learn the most Important Investment Techniques from the Founder of Investor's Business Daily, McGraw-Hill (2000), 
 The Successful Investor: What 80 Million People Need to Know to Invest Profitably and Avoid Big Losses, 2003, McGraw-Hill, 
 Sports Leaders & Success : 55 Top Sports Leaders & How They Achieved Greatness by Investor's Business Daily (author), William J. O'Neil (introduction) (1st edition, June 1, 2004) 
 Military and Political Leaders & Success : 55 Top Military and Political Leaders & How They Achieved Greatness, by Investor's Business Daily (author), William J. O'Neil (Introduction) (1st edition, September 1, 2004) 
 How to Make Money Selling Stocks Short, co-author with Gil Morales,  Wiley (December 24, 2004), 
 Business Leaders and Success, 55 Top Business Leaders and How They Achieved Greatness", 2004, McGraw-Hill 
 How to Make Money in Stocks: Desk Diary 2005, Wiley; Spiral edition (September 6, 2004), 
 Reminiscences of a Stock Operator (by Edwin Lefèvre), William J. O'Neil (Foreword), Wiley; Illustrate edition (September 2004), 
 How to Make Money in Stocks – A Winning System in Good Times Or Bad, McGraw-Hill,  (4th ed., May 18, 2009)The How to Make Money in Stocks Complete Investing System: Your Ultimate Guide to Winning in Good Times and Bad by William J O'Neil (Paperback August 10, 2010)

See also
 Jesse Livermore
 Gerald M. Loeb

References

 Further reading Lessons from the Greatest Stock Traders of All Time, by John Boik (May 21, 2004)How Legendary Traders Made Millions'', by John Boik (March 23, 2006)

External links
 Official website
 William O'Neil Company Profile
 Los Angeles Business Journal interview, March 18, 2002
 "McGraw-Hill Releases New Edition of How to Make Money in Stocks by Investor's Business Daily Founder William J. O'Neil", Investors Business Daily, June 10, 2009

1933 births
Living people
American finance and investment writers
American financial businesspeople
American investors
American money managers
American newspaper publishers (people)
American stockbrokers
American stock traders
Harvard Business School alumni
Businesspeople from Oklahoma City
Stock and commodity market managers
Southern Methodist University alumni
United States Air Force officers
Writers from Texas
Writers from Oklahoma City